Lívio Romano Tragtenberg (born 1961) is a Brazilian musician, composer, music theorist, professor and record producer.

Biography
Tragtenberg was born in São Paulo in 1961, to professor and sociologist  and actress . On his father's side, he is of German-Jewish descent, and has a brother and a sister. When he was 13 years old he learned by himself how to play the drum kit, leading on to other instruments. During his later youth he met and befriended poets Décio Pignatari and siblings Haroldo and Augusto de Campos, who heavily influenced him, later dropping out from high school to follow a career on music. His debut album, Ritual, came out in 1980. Later in the 1980s he composed the operas O. de A. do Brasil and O Inferno de Wall Street, the latter based on a poem by 19th-century author Sousândrade, and was a session musician for the 1988 EP The Early Years, by progressive rock band Violeta de Outono.

He also taught at the Pontifical Catholic University of São Paulo. Around the same time he met and befriended filmmaker Tata Amaral, and subsequently composed the soundtrack of many of her films, such as Um Céu de Estrelas (1996) and Hoje (2011); previously he has also worked with Lúcia Murat in 2000, Joel Pizzini in 2001 and Roberto Moreira in 2004. He also managed the projects Blind Sound Orchestra (which is composed of blind musicians) and the Orquestras de Músicos das Ruas de São Paulo (composed of street musicians of different cultural backgrounds).

In the mid-2010s, Tragtenberg and Rogério Skylab collaborated in a trilogy of albums: Skylab & Tragtenberg, Vol. 1, Vol. 2 and Vol. 3. Skylab once claimed to be a huge fan of Tragtenberg's work, and had previously interviewed him for his talk show Matador de Passarinho. In 2019, Tragtenberg collaborated again with Skylab by pre-mixing and providing samples for the latter's albums Nas Portas do Cu and Crítica da Faculdade do Cu, and once more in 2020 co-authoring his album Os Cosmonautas.

Tragtenberg also authored many books about music theory.

Work

 2019 - CONSTRUTORES DE SONS - CD SELO SESC
 2018 - Skylab & Tragtenberg, Vol. 3 com Rogério Skylab
 2016 - Skylab & Tragtenberg, Vol. 2 com Rogério Skylab
 2016 - Skylab e Tragtenberg, Vol. 1 com Rogério Skylab
 2016 - SOUND BRIDGES EXPEIREIENCE, Mousontourm, Frankfurt Germany.
 2015 - O OFICIO DO COMPOSITOR HOJE (ORG.) Coleção Signos/Música,Editora Perspectiva.
 2014 - Reincorporação dos Homens de Cor, Campinas, SP.
 2013 - Prelúdicos 1-12, CD para piano solo.
 2010 - O Gabinete do Dr. Estranho, instalação na Bienal de São Paulo.
 2009 - Orquestra de Musicos das Ruas do Rio de Janeiro
 2008 - BLIND SOUND ORCHESTRA músicos cegos tocam filmes mudos
 2008 - Voz, Verso e Avesso CD com Lucila Tragtenberg sobre poemas e traduções de Haroldo de Campos.
 2008 - Strassenmusikerberlinerorchester - com músicos das ruas de Berlim, Alemanha
 2007 - Luartrovado" a partir de Pierrot Lunaire de Schoenberg
 2007 - Balada do Deus Morto a partir de Flávio de Carvalho
 2006 - Melodia Cucaracha um musical clandestino
 2005 - Nervous City Orchestra com músicos imigrantes em Miami, EUA.
 2005 - Start collaboration in dance-theatre productions in Germany, in Berlin, Hamburg, Stuttgart, Koln, Essen, Dresden, among others cities.
 2005 - Personas Sonoras com músicos de rua virtuais
 2005 - ReinCorporação Musical com a Corporação Musical Operária da Lapa no Festival 4Hype no SESC Pompéia, São Paulo.
 2004 - Neuropolis com a Orquestra de Músicos das Ruas de São Paulo, CD lançado em 2007 pelo Selo SESC.
 1999 - Parque Industrial teatro musical com vídeo a partir do romance Parque Industrial de Patrícia Galvão (Mara Lobo) - Pagú.
 1998 - Pasolini Suite e Hansel und Gretel Suite, CD, Hamburg, Alemanha.
 1995 - OTHELLO - Das ist Die Nacht CD com Sei Miguel e Silvia Ocougne, Stuttgert, Alemanha.
 1991 - Tatuturema (ópera) (bolsa da John Simon Guggenheim Foundation)
 1998 - Música de Cena - Coleção Signos/Música -Editora Perspectiva
 1997 - Alles Bewegung para piano e orquestra. Estreado pela Orquestra Sinfônica Municipal de Campinas.
 1994 - ANJOS NEGROS - CD com música de teatro 1984-1994)
 1994 - Contraponto, Uma arte de Compor, Editora da Universidade de São Paulo - EDUSP.
 1990 - Artigos Musicais - Coleção Debates, Editora Perspectiva.
 1990 - Teleros para Orquestra e performer sobre texto de Décio Pignatari
 1989 - A Cena da Origem sobre textos e traduções de Haroldo de Campos.
 1987 - Inferno de Wall Street (ópera) (Prêmio Vitae)
 1986 - Bailado do Deus Morto baseado em Flåvio de Carvalho. Oficinas Culturais Tres Rios.
 1985 - Five Saints? - video-instalação na Bienal Internacional de São Paulo, com R. Bulcão.
 1986 - Máscaras para Pound - cantata cênica sobre textos de Ezra Pound para orquestra de câmara e solistas.
 1984 - O. DE A. DO BRASIL para comemoração dos 30 anos de falecimento do poeta Oswald de Andrade. Encomendado pela Prefeitura de São Paulo para o Teatro Municipal de São Paulo. Para orquestra, coro e meios eletrônicos. Estreado em dezembro de 1984.
 1982 - Ritual para Sousândrade com a participação de Baldur Liesenberg e Cristiano Mota. Criações sonoras a partir de textos do poeta maranhense Joaquim de Sousândrade.
 1980 - Ritual, LP, Rio de Janeiro, RJ.
 1979 - Mostra de Musica Contemporânea, Teatro Anchieta, SESC, São Paulo.

References

External links
 
 Lívio Tragtenberg on Discogs

1961 births
Living people
Brazilian composers
Brazilian record producers
Musicians from São Paulo
Brazilian experimental musicians
Brazilian film score composers
Brazilian saxophonists
Brazilian drummers
Male drummers
Brazilian keyboardists
Brazilian clarinetists
Brazilian multi-instrumentalists
Brazilian people of German-Jewish descent
Music theorists
Male opera composers
Brazilian opera composers
20th-century composers
21st-century composers
20th-century male musicians
21st-century male musicians